The Diamond Creek Fire was a wildfire in the Pasayten Wilderness, Okanogan County, Washington, that began with an improperly extinguished campfire on July 23, 2017. In July, the fire threatened historic cabins with destruction. On August 31, it spread to Canada in an area between Cathedral Provincial Park and Manning Provincial Park. On September 6, it grew beyond 100,000 acres to become a megafire. The fire was contained on October 23, 2017.

References

External links

Post-Fire Burned Area Emergency Response Information Brief for the Diamond Creek Fire. 

2017 Washington (state) wildfires
Wildfires in Canada
Wildfires in Washington (state)
2017 disasters in Canada
2017 wildfires in North America